Hunter Sullivan (born August 11, 1965) is a singer, songwriter, bandleader, and actor based in Dallas, Texas. He leads the Hunter Sullivan Big Band, a large jazz ensemble that specializes in classic jazz swing repertoire and the Great American Songbook. He has maintained a long-term residency at The Rosewood Mansion on Turtle Creek in Dallas for several years performing classic pop and romantic ballads with his small band.

Initially discovered by Dennis Hopper, Sullivan produced the King For A Day album with Bobby Darin's producer Nick Venet. The title track, composed by Sullivan and Richard Martin, was licensed for the motion picture Chooch and appeared on the movie's soundtrack. In 2004 he appeared with Lou Diamond Phillips in the film Striking Range. He also had a guest role as Undercover cop Georgie Velez on the “Suspicious Minds” episode of Walker, Texas Ranger. He has appeared on several regional talk shows and sings on numerous national radio jingles and commercials.

Discography 
King for a Day (CD) (1998)
At the Mansion (CD) (2006)

References

External links
  – huntersullivan.com

People from Fort Worth, Texas
1965 births
Living people